Minsk Cycling Club may refer to:

Minsk Cycling Club (men's team), a professional cycling team that competes on the UCI Continental circuits
Minsk Cycling Club (women's team), a professional cycling team that competes on the UCI Women's World Tour